Andrew Fuller Fox (April 26, 1849 – August 29, 1926) was a U.S. Representative from Mississippi.

Born in Reform, Alabama, Fox moved to Calhoun County, Mississippi, with his parents in 1853.
He attended private schools, and was graduated from Mansfield (Texas) College in 1872.
He studied law in Grenada, Mississippi.
He was admitted to the bar in 1877 and commenced practice in Calhoun and Webster Counties.
He moved to West Point, Mississippi, in 1883.
He served as delegate to the Democratic National Convention in 1888.
He served as member of the State senate from 1891 until 1893, when he resigned to accept the office of United States attorney for the northern district of Mississippi.
He resigned the latter office on September 1, 1896.

Fox was elected as a Democrat to the Fifty-fifth, Fifty-sixth, and Fifty-seventh Congresses (March 4, 1897 – March 3, 1903).
He was not a candidate for renomination in 1902.
He served as president of Mississippi State Bar Association in 1911.
He engaged in the practice of law in West Point, Mississippi, until 1914, when he retired.
He died in West Point, Mississippi, August 29, 1926.
He was interred at Greenwood Cemetery in West Point, Mississippi.

References

1849 births
1926 deaths
People from Reform, Alabama
Democratic Party Mississippi state senators
United States Attorneys for the Northern District of Mississippi
Democratic Party members of the United States House of Representatives from Mississippi
People from Calhoun County, Mississippi
People from West Point, Mississippi